The Jane Goodall Institute (JGI) is a global non-profit wildlife and environment conservation organization headquartered in Washington, DC. It was founded in 1977 by English primatologist Jane Goodall and Genevieve di San Faustino (1919-2011). The institute's mission is to improve the treatment and understanding of primates through public education and legal representation, to protect their habitats in partnership with local communities, and to recruit and train young people for these missions.

History
Jane Goodall began her career in 1960 in Gombe National Park, Tanzania. Her research on chimpanzees proved that they are close to humans not only genetically, but also in their behavior. At the beginning of her research, she was able to work in an untouched forest, but over the years, the local population cleared larger and larger areas of trees and destroyed animals. Jane Goodall realized that in order for the chimpanzees to survive, she had to protect their habitat, but for this, it was necessary that the living conditions of the local population were suitable and that they cooperated in nature conservation work, knowing the common goal. This led to the founding of the Jane Goodall Institute.

At first, the daily activities of the institute were carried out from home by committee members and volunteers. In the early 1980s, the institute moved into the San Francisco office of the California Academy of Sciences and later to Washington, D.C.

Offices and partnerships
The institute has offices in more than twenty-five countries around the world. With the recognition of a non-governmental organization by the city's municipal government, the Shanghai office became the first and only foreign environmental protection organization in China

There is also a close partnership with the Jane Goodall Center for Excellence in Environmental Studies at the American Western Connecticut State University in Danbury in northern Connecticut.

In Congo, the institute has maintained the Tchimpounga Chimpanzee Rehabilitation Center since 1999. It has 26 hectares of land at its disposal and a protected area of 72.84 km² was set up nearby by the government of Congo in March 1999. It is used to house orphaned chimpanzees.

Jane Goodall Environmental Middle School is a grades 6 through 8 school in Salem, Oregon, with a focus on environmental protection.

Activities

Protecting Great Apes
JGI works to protect chimpanzees and other primates by supporting sanctuaries, law enforcement efforts to reduce illegal trafficking, and public education to protect endangered species in the wild. The Chimp Eden Sanctuary in South Africa is one of the institute's sanctuaries. It is located in a forested reserve between Nelspruit and Barberton in Mpumalanga.

Improving Gender and Health Outcomes
JGI achieves this through community-centered health projects, improvements to water supplies, and programs designed to keep girls in school.

Promoting Sustainable Livelihoods
JGI does this through improved agricultural practices, community-managed microcredit programs, and sustainable production techniques that increase incomes while protecting forests and watersheds.

Cookbook 
In 2021, the institute published a cookbook titled “The Jane Goodall Institute #EatMeatless." The book's forward was written by Jane Goodall, a longtime vegetarian and now vegan. Vegan expert Avery Yale Kamila included the cookbook on her list of 2021's best cookbooks. Food writer Mark Bittman interviewed Jane Goodall about the book on his podcast. Veganuary listed the book no. 1 on its list of Best Vegan Cookbooks.

See also
 Jane Goodall Center for Excellence in Environmental Studies
 Jane Goodall Environmental Middle School
 Roots & Shoots
 Tchimpounga Chimpanzee Sanctuary 
 Gombe Stream National Park
Chimp Eden

References

External links
 Jane Goodall Institute

Nature conservation organizations based in the United States
Primatology
Jane Goodall
Organizations established in 1977
Charities based in England